Calosoma breviusculum is a species of ground beetle in the family Carabidae. It is found in Turkey, Georgia, Armenia, Iran, and Azerbaijan.

Subspecies
These three subspecies belong to the species Calosoma breviusculum:
 Calosoma breviusculum breviusculum (Mannerheim, 1830)  (Armenia, Georgia, and Turkey)
 Calosoma breviusculum pumicatum Lapouge, 1907  (Iran)
 Calosoma breviusculum substriatum (Motschulsky, 1860)  (Azerbaijan)

References

breviusculum
Beetles described in 1830